Tatarlar is a village in the Süloğlu District of Edirne Province in Turkey.

Population

References

Villages in Süloğlu District